Sailing SV Delos is a YouTube channel that chronicles the travels and adventures of video bloggers aboard the sailing vessel Delos. The boat is owned by Brian Trautman, who sails with his wife Karin Syrén and their daughter Sierra (aka Nugget). Trautman and Karin sailed  Delos for many years with Trautman's brother Brady, along with an ever-changing crew, including Alex Blue. The team often invites new crew members aboard for their journeys who contribute to sailing, boat maintenance, and filming. The films include experiences and adventures, which include island exploration, hiking, underwater diving, partying, meeting local people, boat maintenance, and simple day-to-day living, boat repairs, emergency procedures in addition to their experience crossing oceans. Delos has made several ocean crossings, sometimes through heavy weather conditions such as severe lightning storms, and once tackling a 50-knot gale en route to Madagascar.

Background
Trautman grew up in Flagstaff, Arizona with a love of the outdoors, and worked as a diesel mechanic during his high school years, later earning a degree in electrical engineering from the University of Washington. He worked at Microsoft before starting his own software company but he soon grew tired of 60-hour workweeks. What inspired him to think about crossing oceans in a boat was reading the book Three Years in a 12-Foot Boat by Stephen G. Ladd. He spent several years researching and saving money and narrowed down his list of boats to French-made Amel Super Maramu. 

His first voyage began in 2009 in Seattle, Washington in the United States. He sailed to Mexico where he was joined by his brother Brady, and the two of them along with Brian's then-partner sailed for New Zealand. There he met his future wife Karin Syrén who began sailing with them. In their early days, they often had to work in local marinas to make money for boat repairs and fuel. In 2014, the crew re-thought their business model, and learned how to support their income from YouTube with crowdfunding and Patreon campaigns.

The channel
The Delos team has made more than 300 videos on its YouTube channel. The channel saw rapid growth over the years from 90,000 subscribers in December 2016 to 585,000 subscribers , and now has over 772,000 subscribers as of 2022.  On Instagram, it had over 170,000 followers . It received 1.8 million views per month in December 2019. A 2019 report in Yachting World magazine suggested that the crew made $14,000 for each video from paying donors, and produced about four videos each month.

The boat
Delos is a 53-foot long Amel Super Maramu, built in La Rochelle, France purchased by Trautman in 2008. It sleeps six people comfortably.  From 2008 to 2021, Trautman and crew sailed Delos more than 70,000 miles.  As a former electrical engineer, Trautman used his knowledge to make various improvements to the boat  installing lithium-phosphate batteries to power the vessel, a battery management system (to provide energy to power laptops), electric cooking units, and the navigation systems. The crew has taken numerous steps to make Delos environmentally-friendly.

Philanthropy
The crew engaged in numerous philanthropic endeavors, such as contributing to restoration efforts on the island of Dominica which was ravaged by Hurricane Maria in 2017. In 2019, they donated $50,000 US dollars to various charities such as the Surfrider Foundation which seeks to protect the world's oceans.

References

External links
 

Entertainment-related YouTube channels
English-language YouTube channels
Sailing expeditions
Sailboats